Jim Fiala is a chef who owns two restaurants in the St. Louis, Missouri area. His restaurants are The Crossing in Clayton, Missouri and  Acero in Maplewood, Missouri.

Jim Fiala is a St. Louis area native, who grew up in the suburbs of Crestwood, Sunset Hills and unincorporated West County. He is a 1983 graduate of Parkway West High School. (He is a 2014 inductee into the Parkway Alumni Hall of Fame.) He has a degree in Finance from Southern Methodist University in Dallas, Texas.

Fiala’s parents introduced him to fine dining at an early age. For his 13th birthday he was taken to dinner at St. Louis’ most elite restaurant, Tony’s. When the family traveled to New York or Los Angeles, they always dined at the places that were highly rated in the Michelin guide. [1]

Early Training
Upon graduation from S.M.U., Fiala worked briefly in the Dallas area for an agency that promoted professional wrestling in Texas. In early 1988, he joined Clipper Cruise Lines as a deckhand. When an opening occurred in the kitchen, he took the job and began his career in cooking. He says “I got stuck in the galley for seven weeks and fell in love with cooking.” [2]

In late 1989, Fiala returned to St. Louis and worked for just over a year preparing food for Catering St. Louis. Fiala enrolled in the California Culinary Academy in San Francisco at the beginning of 1991. During his time in the Bay Area he worked for chef Jeremiah Trotter at Stars restaurant and for chef Patricia Unterman at Hayes Street Grill.

Chicago and New York 
Upon graduation from California Culinary Academy in November, 1992, Jim Fiala returned to the Midwest and accepted a job offer from Chicago’s Spiaggia restaurant in the Gold Coast area. He started at $6.50/hour and performed every aspect of kitchen work. [3]

In 1994, Paul Bartolotta of Spiaggia called Daniel Boulud, owner of Restaurant Daniel in New York City, and asked if he needed staff. Boulud said yes and asked about Fiala “Can he handle the pressure?” Bartolotta assured him that Fiala was ready for the move to the Big Apple. Fiala’s kitchen jobs in New York included “entrimitier” (vegetable cook) and “poussioniere” (fish cook). He also, for a time, made all the restaurant’s pasta. During his tenure there, Restaurant Daniel earned its New York Times four star rating. [4]

Following his time in New York City, Jim Fiala was recruited to cook at the Horned Dorsett Primavera resort in Puerto Rico.

Return to St. Louis 

In late 1997, Fiala came back to St. Louis. On April 15, 1998, with then business partner Cary McDowell, Fiala opened The Crossing (7823 Forsyth Boulevard) in Clayton. The name of the restaurant represented a “crossing” of Italian and French influences. The restaurant received several positive reviews early on and has enjoyed strong popularity as a leader of the “new breed” of fine dining establishments in metro St. Louis. [5]

R.W. Apple Jr. wrote about The Crossing in the New York Times: “Two chefs from Daniel in New York have set St. Louis on its conservative ear with this stylish bilevel establishment. A piece of poached skate that all but melted into a pile of mashed potatoes, formed the centerpiece of a satisfying meal that began with roasted beets and goat cheese and ended with perfectly simple, simply perfect vanilla ice cream.” [6]

Patricia Corrigan of the St. Louis Post-Dispatch named The Crossing 1998’s Best New Restaurant and called The Crossing’s Beef Tenderloin the year’s best Beef Entrée. [7]

Joe Bonwich, then writing for the Riverfront Times, said of The Crossing: “The result is a truly unique and innovative style for St. Louis and we should all be hopeful that Fiala’s youthful wanderlust has worn off and that he’s come back to stay.” He added: “This place certainly aspires to a national reputation.” [8]

John Garganigo of the Ladue News wrote: “In a short period of three months it (The Crossing) has become the darling of local movers and shakers.” [9]

As The Crossing grew into its position as an upscale, more formal, fine dining destination, Fiala and his partner sought to establish a more casual version of The Crossing in the Central West End. Liluma opened in 2002 and had a successful run until its closing in December, 2012.

Acero 

Jim Fiala’s Italian restaurant is Acero in suburban Maplewood, Missouri (7266 Manchester Road). Acero’s opening on March 2, 2007, was followed by an overwhelming number of positive reviews. In a city famous for Italian restaurants, Acero stands out. Acero is distinctive because it features the regional cuisine of Tuscany and Emilia Romagna in Northern Italy. Acero is the Italian word for maple.

Acero was featured in 2008 in the annual Restaurant issue of Bon Appetit magazine. “The Best Italian Food in America” were the words on the cover of the issue (September, 2008). [11] Inside the magazine was a feature that included recipes from twelve different restaurants in the U.S. Acero’s contribution was its cauliflower ravioli with guanciale. Acero was the only St. Louis restaurant included. [12]

Fiala’s concept for Acero is “artisan.” He says “I want Acero to be recognized as an ‘artisan’ restaurant, a place that embraces the Italian artisans, the guys who…have elevated our palates and now our expectations.” [13]

Personal Philosophy

Jim Fiala is a “hands on” owner who spends time at each of his restaurants daily. His top priority is quality control. His mission: “We work on improving everyday.” He has told his employees that their goal should be to make “every meal a great meal.” [14]

Jim Fiala visited Italy in February, 2009. While dining at a restaurant in the state of Abruzzo, Jim met a man named Luigi Cataldi Madonna. Jim says that Luigi summarized Jim's own cooking philosophy in these few words: "Find the complexity in the simple." Fiala also visited Italy in 2011.

Jim Fiala is married and has three children.

References

[1,3] St. Louis Business Journal, March 23–29, 2001, “Three Years and Counting.”

[2] St. Louis Post-Dispatch, March 20, 1999, “Set Sail for a Dining Adventure.”

[4] New York Times, November 11, 1994, “Restaurants.” (Review of Restaurant Daniel.)

[5] Ladue News, July 24, 1998, “New Kids on the Block.”

[6] New York Times, April 16, 1999, “A City of Music, Art and Gardens, With a Beer-and-Baseball Chaser.”

[7] St. Louis Post-Dispatch, December 29, 1998 “Only the Best: Restaurant Critic Lists Her Favorites from a Year in the Trenches.”

[8] Riverfront Times, January 6–12, 1999, “1998: The Year in Dining,”

[9] Ladue News, September 11, 1998, “New Entrée.”

[10] Riverfront Times, December 11, 2002, “Split Personality.”

[11] Bon Appetit, September, 2008, “Molto Americano.”

[12] Bon Appetit, September, 2008, “Cauliflower Ravioli with Guanciale.”

[13] St. Louis magazine, April, 2007, “Chef Q & A: Jim Fiala.”

[14] St. Louis Post-Dispatch, January 18, 2001, “Raves Roll on at The Crossing and Café Mira.”

[15] Sauce magazine, December, 2011, "Liluma's Laid-Back Little Sister."

[16] Dine.com/restaurants

Links to references:

https://web.archive.org/web/20081013044204/http://stlmag.com/media/St-Louis-Magazine/April-2007/Chef-QA-Jim-Fiala/

https://query.nytimes.com/gst/fullpage.html?res=9804E7D81F3EF932A25752C1A962958260&sec=&spon=&&scp=15&sq=restaurant%20reviews%20ruth%20reichl%20daniel%201994&st=cse

https://query.nytimes.com/gst/fullpage.html?res=9E05E6DC153BF935A25757C0A96F958260

http://www.riverfronttimes.com/1999-01-06/restaurants/1998-the-year-in-dining/

http://www.rftstl.com/2002-12-11/dining/split-personality/

https://web.archive.org/web/20080929150709/http://www.bonappetit.com/magazine/2008/09/molto_americano

http://www.bonappetit.com/magazine/2008/09/cauliflower_ravioli_with_guanciale

http://www.saucemagazine.com/a/1633

http://dine.com/restaurants/rid/177396/Liluma-Saint-Louis-Missouri.html

American chefs
American male chefs
Living people
Year of birth missing (living people)